Amelia Eve Gibson (born 19 June 2004) is an English actress. She is known for her role as Kelly Neelan in the ITV soap opera Coronation Street (2019–2022). For her portrayal of Kelly, Gibson won the British Soap Award for Best Young Performer in 2022. In November 2022, it was announced Gibson would join the cast of Doctor Who as new companion Ruby Sunday.

Early life
Gibson was born on 19 June 2004 in Greater Manchester. She developed a scar on her left eyebrow from falling down a set of stairs as a baby. From the Tameside village of Broadbottom, she attended the Blue Coat School in Oldham. She took drama classes at Oldham Theatre Workshop, where she was spotted by Manchester Media City talent agency Scream Management, who began representing her.

Career
Gibson made her acting debut as Indira Cave in the CBBC television series Jamie Johnson. Gibson went on to star in the second and third series, appearing in a total of 17 episodes. In November 2017, she appeared as Mia in the third episode of the BBC One drama series Love, Lies and Records. In October 2018, she appeared in the three-part ITV drama series Butterfly as Lily Duffy, the older sister of character Maxine (Callum Booth-Ford) who realises she is a transgender girl.

In June 2019, Gibson joined the cast of the ITV soap opera Coronation Street as Kelly Neelan. Her character was introduced as the daughter of established character Rick Neelan (Greg Wood) and she originally appeared in five episodes, before returning as a regular character in April 2020. During Gibson's time on the show, her character's storylines have included being involved in a high-profile hate crime storyline, being found guilty of murder, dealing with the death of her mother Laura Neelan (Kel Allen) from cancer, and being kidnapped and held captive. For her portrayal of Kelly, she won the award for Best Young Actor at the 2022 British Soap Awards. She was also nominated for Best Actress at the Inside Soap Awards later that year. In August 2022, it was announced Gibson had decided to leave the soap and that she would depart later in the year.

In November 2022, it was announced during the BBC's annual Children in Need telethon that Gibson would join the cast of Doctor Who in 2023 as Ruby Sunday, the companion of the Fifteenth Doctor, portrayed by Ncuti Gatwa.

Filmography

Television

Stage

Radio

Awards and nominations

References

External links
 

Living people
2004 births
21st-century English actresses
Actresses from Greater Manchester
Actresses from Oldham
English child actresses
English soap opera actresses
English television actresses
People from Tameside (district)
English radio actresses
English stage actresses